Kūsheh-ye Soflá (also Romanized as Kūsheh-ye Soflá and Koosheh Sofla; also known as Kūsheh-ye Pā’īn) is a village in Khusf Rural District, Central District, Khusf County, South Khorasan Province, Iran. At the 2006 census, its population was 88, in 31 families.

References 

Populated places in Khusf County